Blow by Blow is Jeff Beck's second album credited to him as a solo artist. It was recorded in October 1974 and released via Epic Records in 1975. An instrumental album, it peaked at No. 4 on the American Billboard 200 and was certified platinum by the RIAA.

Background and content
After the dissolution of the power trio Beck, Bogert & Appice (BBA) in spring 1974, Beck took time for session work with other groups. In December, a half-hearted "audition" for The Rolling Stones took place, Beck jamming blues with the band for one day, before realising their musical styles were not compatible.

During this period, Beck decided to record an all-instrumental album, bringing back keyboardist Max Middleton from the second Jeff Beck Group. He hired George Martin to produce after hearing his work with the Mahavishnu Orchestra's 1974 album Apocalypse. According to Carmine Appice, who played with Beck in BBA, he was involved in the writing and recording process of Blow by Blow but his parts were edited out after a dispute with Beck's management. The fourth key contributor to Blow by Blow after Beck, Middleton, and Martin was Stevie Wonder, who gave Beck his songs "Cause We've Ended as Lovers" and "Thelonius", with Wonder playing clavinet on the latter uncredited. The former song appeared on Wonder's 1974 album Stevie Wonder Presents: Syreeta, made with then-wife Syreeta Wright, while Wonder never recorded "Thelonius" himself. A cover of the Beatles song "She's a Woman" was selected, as well as the composition "Diamond Dust" by Bernie Holland of the group Hummingbird consisting of musicians from the second Beck Group. The other five tracks were band originals with Beck and Middleton the main writers, and the last track on each side featured string arrangements by Martin. Beck dedicated "Cause We've Ended as Lovers" to fellow guitarist Roy Buchanan, with an acknowledgement to Wonder.

Release
Blow by Blow was released on 29 March 1975. It was a hit in the US, reaching number four on the Billboard album charts, eventually selling a million copies. It remains Beck's highest-charting album.

On 27 March 2001, a remastered edition for compact disc was reissued by Legacy Records, Epic and its parent label Columbia Records now a division of Sony Music Entertainment.

A live version of the track "Scatterbrain" was featured in the video game Guitar Hero 5.

Track listing

 Note: "Scatterbrain is misprinted as being 3:39 on some LP centres. 5:39 is correct.

Personnel
Musicians
 Jeff Beck – guitars
 Max Middleton – keyboards
 Phil Chen – bass (identified as "Phil Chenn")
 Richard Bailey – drums, percussion
 Stevie Wonder – uncredited clavinet on "Thelonius"

Technical
 George Martin – production, orchestral arrangement
 Denim Bridges – engineering

Artwork
 John Berg – design
 John Collier – cover art

Certifications

See also
1975 in music
Jeff Beck discography

References

External links 
 Jeff Beck - Blow by Blow (1975) album review by Mark Kirschenmann, credits & releases at AllMusic
 Jeff Beck - Blow by Blow (1975) album releases & credits at Discogs
 Jeff Beck - Blow by Blow (1975) album credits & user reviews at ProgArchives.com
 Jeff Beck - Blow by Blow (1975) album to be listened as stream on Spotify

1975 albums
Jeff Beck albums
Albums produced by George Martin
Jazz fusion albums by English artists
Epic Records albums
Albums arranged by George Martin